Pembroke Street South Pond is a  pond in Kingston, Massachusetts. The pond is located on Route 27 northwest of the intersection with Winter Street and Reed Street, south of Reeds Millpond. Pine Brook, a tributary of the Jones River, flows through the pond. The water quality is impaired due to non-native aquatic plants and non-native fish in the pond.

External links
Environmental Protection Agency
South Shore Coastal Watersheds - Lake Assessments

Ponds of Plymouth County, Massachusetts
Kingston, Massachusetts
Ponds of Massachusetts